The Shootout is a 1992 Hong Kong action film directed by Michael Mak and starring Aaron Kwok, Fennie Yuen, Bryan Leung and Sean Lau.

Plot
Hon (Elvis Tsui), Hei, Koon and Bonnie (Kingdom Yuen) are a group of bank robbers who hijacked an armoured truck. Hon and Hei managed to escape from the cops while Koon and Bonnie encounter rookie cop Wong Ka-fai (Aaron Kwok), whom arrests Koon when he fell off his motorcycle. Knowing that one of his accomplices were arrested, Hon bursts into the police station and murders Koon to prevent divulgence of his crimes.

Since this case is serious, Ka-fai and his colleague Mei-san (Ngai Suet) were transferred to the Regional Crime Unit to assist in investigation, where they collaborate with Inspector Lau (Sean Lau) and Ma (Bryan Leung), whom are frenemies. First, they investigate the armoured truck guards before finding clues that lead them to a karaoke bar, where Ka-fai falls in love with an innocent singer named Man (Fennie Yuen). Soon later, Ka-fai found clues about the hijack case from Man, who turns out to be Hon's girlfriend.

Cast
Aaron Kwok as Wong Ka-fai
Fennie Yuen as Man
Bryan Leung as Inspector Ma
Sean Lau as Inspector Lau
Elvis Tsui as Hon
Ngai Suet as Lee Mei-san
Kingdom Yuen as Bonnie
Anderson Junior
Ng Ching-mau
Timothy Zao as Robber
Law Shu-kei as Doctor
Wong Chung-kui
Chang Sing-kwong as Policeman
Ailen Sit as Policeman
Dion Lam as Policeman
Simon Cheung as Policeman
Chow Shing-boh as Pimp
Fong Li as Pimp
Wong Man-chun as Policeman

Reception

Critical
LoveHKFilm gave the film a mixed review noting its uninspiring comedy and lack of plot and developed characters but praises the grittiness of the action scenes.

Box office
The film grossed HK$3,819,056 at the Hong Kong box office during its theatrical run from 27 June to 3 July 1992.

See also
Aaron Kwok filmography
Jackie Chan filmography

References

External links

The Shootout at Hong Kong Cinemagic

1992 films
1992 action films
1992 martial arts films
1990s buddy cop films
1990s buddy comedy films
Films directed by Michael Mak
Films set in Hong Kong
Films shot in Hong Kong
Gun fu films
Hong Kong action comedy films
Hong Kong buddy films
Hong Kong martial arts films
Police detective films
1990s Cantonese-language films
1990s Hong Kong films